Populated place in Ukraine is a structural element of human settling system, a stationary settlement, territorially integral compact area of population concentration basic and important feature of which is permanent human habitation. Populated places in Ukraine are systematized into two major categories: urban and rural. Urban populated places can be either cities or urban settlements, while rural populated places can be either villages or rural settlements. According to the 2001 Ukrainian Census there are 1,344 urban populated places and 28,621 rural populated places in Ukraine.

All populated places are governed by their municipality (hromada), may it be a village, a city or any settlement hromada. A municipality may consist of one or several populated places and is (except Kyiv and Sevastopol) a constituent part of a raion (district) which in turn is constituents of an oblast (province).

Beside regular populated places in Ukraine that are part of administrative division and population census, there are several additional categories for populated places that are used for other purposes. Among such categories are mountainous populated places, historic populated places, and others.

Urban populated places

Cities

City with special status is treated as a city-region. Most cities in Ukraine are the centres of the corresponding municipality (hromada). Only 8 cities (Stebnyk, Sosnivka, Uhniv, Ukrainsk, Bilytske, Rodynske and Hirnyk, Donetsk Oblast) are included into another municipality. Two cities (Chernobyl and Pripyat) are abandoned and are governed by the State Agency of Ukraine on the Exclusion Zone Management.

City status a settlement receives on a decision of the Supreme Council of Ukraine - Verkhovna Rada.

Cities that have population of less than 50,000 are considered to be small cities and fall under a special state program in development of small cities. According to the 2001 Ukrainian Census there are 454 cities in Ukraine, among which two with special status (Kyiv and Sevastopol).

Urban-type settlements

Urban-type settlement is a Soviet invented term for a populated place with some degree of urbanization or in proximity to an urbanized area. In the Constitution of Ukraine urban settlement is mentioned simply as selysche (a settlement), which also adds another ambiguity to the administrative territorial system of Ukraine. The term selysche is also used to some smaller populated places, while can be found within other administrative territorial subdivisions. Those settlements implicitly known as rural settlements, while often presented simply as settlements.

According to the 2001 Ukrainian Census there are 890 urban settlements in Ukraine.

Rural populated places
Rural populated places or rural localities can refer to two different types of inhabited places: villages and rural settlements. Rural populated places in Ukraine are very underdeveloped and often lack basic types of infrastructure: transportation, utilities and others.

Villages
Village as a term became systematic for a conventional rural populated place and most numerous out of all terms used for populated places in a country. It is administrated by silrada (a rural council) and is the lowest level and most common form of territorial administration at that level. A rural council may be composed of a single village or group of villages. According to the 2001 Ukrainian Census there are 27,190 villages in Ukraine that organized into 10,278 rural (village) councils.

Rural settlements
The term selysche (settlement) has a double meaning in the administrative-territorial system of Ukraine. It may be used either for urban-type settlements or for some smaller populated places which often part of silrada (a rural council), while can be found within other administrative territorial subdivisions. Those settlements are implicitly known as rural settlements while often presented simply as settlements which might give the impression of an urban settlement.

Most often rural settlements are constituent parts of adjacent village, urban settlement or city, while on some occasions may be administrated by their own rural council. Unlike villages, a rural settlement may be part of a city or another settlement council. According to the 2001 Ukrainian Census there are 1,266 rural settlements in Ukraine.

Other populated places
In 1995 there was created a special category for mountainous populated places in Ukraine. Mountainous status is received by populated places located in mountainous area, have inadequately developed sphere of employment and social services as well as a limited transportation access (low development density of infrastructure or infrastructure is weak).

Historic types of populated places
Among historic types of populated places in Ukraine are places like khutir, prysilok, zymivnyk, mistechko, sloboda, horod. Collective and/or soviet farms used to be based either on an individual settlement (village) or include several neighboring rural settlements (villages, khutirs, slobodas).

Ukrainian khutirs were destroyed in 1930s-1940s during the Soviet occupation as part of the fight with individual farming (dekulakization campaign).

See also

 Geography of Ukraine
 ISO 3166-2:UA
 List of places named after people (Ukraine)
 The History of Cities and Villages of the Ukrainian SSR, a comprehensive encyclopedic compilation of all populated places

References

External links

 About order for solution of issues on the administrative-territorial system of the Ukrainian SSR. Ukase of Presidium of the Verkhovna Rada of Ukrainian SSR. N 1654-X. 1981-03-12. (current)
 About the status of mountainous populated places in Ukraine. Law of Ukraine. N 56/95-VR. 1995-02-15. (current)
 Androshchuk, O. Urban settlements in a system of territorial setting in the Ukrainian SSR in 40s-60s of the 20th century. "Krayeznavstvo". 2006.

 
Subdivisions of Ukraine
Ukraine 3